Giovanni Pipino di Altamura (Giovanni Pipino II or just Giovanni Pipino) (death: Altamura, 1357) was an Italian nobleman and condottiero. He belonged to the Pipino noble family, which began with Giovanni Pipino da Barletta (died 1316 in Naples) and that, after just a few decades, declined.

He was the count of Minervino Murge and Altamura, as well as the grandson of Giovanni Pipino da Barletta. Together with his brothers, he was well known for his violent character and arrogance towards the people he ruled over. According to sources, the brothers tried to subjugate many cities and territories of the Kingdom of Naples over the first half of the XIV century, taking advantage of the disorder and absence of power in the Kingdom of Naples which started right before the death of Robert of Anjou, king of Naples. Giovanni and his brothers did not comply with Robert's orders and, because of this and their arrogance, they were imprisoned. They managed to leave  prison only after the king's death. They often changed sides: first, they fought for Andrew of Hungary, and then for Joanna I of Naples and her husband Louis, Prince of Taranto. Eventually, they backed Louis of Durazzo.

Because of his character and his disloyalty to the king, Giovanni Pipino di Altamura was captured in 1357 in Matera Castle and then he was brought to the nearby city of Altamura, where he was hanged from the battlements of Altamura Castle. According to the book Vita di Cola di Rienzo (written by an anonymous author), he had to wear a paper crown because he called himself "king of Apulia". His corpse was then dismembered in four parts, which were then displayed in areas of the city of Altamura as a warning to the subjects. One of his legs was displayed on the right of Porta Matera (one of the main gates of the City Walls of Altamura). The leg was then replaced by a bas-relief depicting Pipino's coat of arms and his leg. The bas-relief was destroyed and rebuilt in 1648 because of the restoration of the city walls; it is still visible on the right side of Porta Matera.

Shortly thereafter, his brother Luigi Pipino was also captured and hanged on the battlements of the castle of Minervino Murge; while the last brother Pietro Pipino went into a self-imposed exile in Rome, losing all the property of his family and ending the Pipino dynasty.

Coat of arms 
The coat of arms of the Pipino family is shown in the tomb of Giovanni Pipino da Barletta (located in the church of San Pietro a Majella, Naples) and it's made of a gray background, and a light blue transverse band containing three golden shells.

The coat of arms can also be seen inside the castle of Minervino Murge, but it's been partly damaged, presumably by his and his brothers' enemies.

Family 
 Nicola Pipino (great grandfather)
 Giovanni Pipino da Barletta (?-1316) (grandfather)
 Nicola Pipino (uncle)
 Niccolò Pipino (father)
 Giovannella di Altamura (mother) - daughter of Giovanni di Sparano di Bari
 Angiola Pipino (aunt)
 Margherita Pipino (aunt)
 Maria Pipino (aunt)
 Pietro Pipino (brother)
 Luigi (o Ludovico) Pipino (brother)
 Matteo Pipino (brother)

Sources 
 
 
  (In this book, Giovanni Pipino di Altamura is called "il Paladino", while his grandfather is called "Gianni Pipino")

References

Bibliography

External links
 Treccani.it - Giovanni Pipino
 Treccani.it - Pipino, conti di Altamura
 Giovanni Pipino - Condottieri di ventura - condottieridiventura.it

Year of birth unknown
1357 deaths
14th-century Italian nobility
14th-century condottieri